Chakri Toleti is an Indian American business executive who is the founder and chief executive officer (CEO) of care.ai, a health technology company. 

Before this, Toleti was the Founder and President of HealthGrid, an enterprise patient engagement platform designed to connect patients and providers via their smart devices. In 2018, HealthGrid was acquired by Allscripts to integrate HealthGrid’s functionality into their FollowMyHealth platform. Prior to HealthGrid, Toleti co-founded Galvanon, a company that first introduced patient self-service kiosk registration to automate patient check-in and intake processes NCR acquired Galvanon in 2005. 

Toleti was also an active screenwriter, director, actor, and visual effects coordinator known for his works in Tamil cinema, and Hindi cinema. Toleti made his directorial debut with the bilingual films Unnaipol Oruvan (2009) and Eeenadu (2009) a remake of Neeraj Pandey's Hindi film, A Wednesday (2008). In 2012, he directed a gangster film Billa II. In 2019, he directed two remakes of the Mike Flanagan slasher film Hush: the Hindi Khamoshi, and the Tamil Kolaiyuthir Kaalam.

Career

Filmography
Toleti made his acting debut as a child artist in the Telugu film Sagara Sangamam directed by K. Viswanath, and has acted in over fifteen films. He obtained a bachelor's degree in Film and VFX at the University of Central Florida. He re-entered south Indian cinema with the magnum opus, Dasavathaaram. In 2019, he directed two remake films of the Mike Flanagan slasher film Hush: the Hindi Khamoshi, and the Tamil Kolaiyuthir Kaalam.

Galvanon
Toleti co-founded Galvanon in 2002.

HealthGrid
Toleti founded HealthGrid in 2014 and served as President

care.ai
care.ai was founded in 2019 in Orlando, Florida, by Toleti, the Founder and current CEO. The Smart Care Facility Platform is the main product which converts care facilities into an AI-powered environment that monitors clinical and operational workflows.

Filmography

As director

As actor

References

External links
 Kamalji gave me 100 per cent control over Unnaipol Oruvan
 Interview with Chakri Toleti
 Chakri Toleti

University of Central Florida alumni
American film directors of Indian descent
Tamil film directors
Telugu film directors
Indian male film actors
Visual effects artists
Special effects people
Special effects coordinators
American people of Telugu descent
Male actors in Tamil cinema
Male actors in Telugu cinema
20th-century births
Living people
Telugu male actors
American male actors of Indian descent
Film directors from Andhra Pradesh
Artists from Visakhapatnam
Year of birth missing (living people)